The Union of Sardinians – Nationalist Project (Unione dei Sardi – Progetto Nazionalitario, UDS–PN) is a regionalist Christian-democratic political party in Sardinia. Its leader is Mario Floris, a former Christian Democrat who was President of the Region from 1999 to 2001.

History
The Sardinian Democratic Union was founded in 1998 as Sardinian section of Democratic Union for the Republic of Francesco Cossiga, a Sardinian who had been Prime Minister and President of Italy. In the 1999 regional election Floris won 6.2% as candidate for president, while the party won 4.1% and three regional councillors.

In the 2004 regional election the UDS, which had been re-established taking the current name, won 3.9% of the vote and two regional councillors. After that, the party became a stable regional ally of The People of Freedom (PdL). In the 2009 regional election, in coalition with the centre-right, the UDS won 3.5% of the vote and got two regional councillors elected (Floris and a member of the New Italian Socialist Party). In the 2010 provincial elections the party was strongest in the Province of Cagliari, where it won 3.8% of the vote.

Since 2008 the party was for a while the regional section of the Alliance of the Centre, a small party that was later merged into PdL.

In the 2014 regional election the UDS obtained 2.6% of the vote and Floris was once again re-elected to the Council.

See also
Sardinian nationalism

References

Political parties in Sardinia
Political parties established in 1998
Sardinian nationalist parties
1998 establishments in Italy